Nicolas Jarry may refer to:

 Nicolas Jarry (calligrapher), 17th-century French calligrapher
 Nicolás Jarry (born 1995), Chilean professional tennis player